Velike Poljane is a village in the Municipality of Ribnica in southern Slovenia. It lies in the hills east of the main road and railway line from Ljubljana to Ribnica at Ortnek. The area is part of the traditional region of Lower Carniola and is now included in the Southeast Slovenia Statistical Region.

Church

The local parish church is dedicated to Saint Joseph and belongs to the Roman Catholic Archdiocese of Ljubljana. It was built in 1900. A second church, built next to the cemetery 1 km south of the settlement, is dedicated to Saint Thomas and dates to the 16th century with 17th-century alterations.

References

External links

Velike Poljane on Geopedia

Populated places in the Municipality of Ribnica